Anne-Marie Olivier (born 1973) is a Canadian stage actress and playwright from Quebec, who won the Governor General's Award for French-language drama for her play Venir au monde at the 2018 Governor General's Awards.

The artistic director of Théâtre Le Trident, she was named Artist of the Year for 2018 by Le Soleil and the Société Radio-Canada.

Plays
Boa Constrictor - 2005
Gros et détail - 2005
Le Psychomaton - 2007
Regards-9 (Un jeudi soir à l'espo) - 2008
7 péchés, quand le musée parle au Diable! - 2009
Mon corps deviendra froid - 2011
Annette - 2012
S'appartenir(e) - 2015
Faire l'amour - 2016
Venir au monde - 2018

References

1973 births
Living people
21st-century Canadian actresses
21st-century Canadian dramatists and playwrights
21st-century Canadian women writers
Canadian women dramatists and playwrights
Canadian dramatists and playwrights in French
Canadian stage actresses
Canadian theatre directors
Actresses from Quebec
Writers from Quebec
French Quebecers
Governor General's Award-winning dramatists